David Rees (born 29 December 1940) is a British cross-country skier. He competed in the men's 15 kilometre event at the 1964 Winter Olympics.

References

1940 births
Living people
British male cross-country skiers
Olympic cross-country skiers of Great Britain
Cross-country skiers at the 1964 Winter Olympics
People from Ammanford
Sportspeople from Carmarthenshire